ROCS Wu Chang (PFG-1207) is a Kang Ding-class frigate of the Republic of China Navy.

Development and design 
As the ROC (Taiwan)'s defensive stance is aimed towards the Taiwan Strait, the ROC Navy is constantly seeking to upgrade its anti-submarine warfare capabilities. The US$1.75 billion agreement with France in the early 1990s was an example of this procurement strategy, the six ships are configured for both ASW and surface attack. The Exocet was replaced by Taiwan-developed Hsiung Feng II anti-ship missile and the AAW weapon is the Sea Chaparral. The main gun is an Oto Melara 76 mm/62 mk 75 gun, similar to its Singaporean counterparts, the Formidable-class frigates. Some problems in the integration of Taiwanese and French systems had been reported. The frigate carries a single Sikorsky S-70C(M)-1/2 ASW helicopter.

The Sea Chaparral SAM system is considered inadequate for defense against aircraft and anti-ship missiles, so the ROC (Taiwan) Navy plans to upgrade its air-defense capabilities with the indigenous TC-2N in 2020. The AMRAAM missiles will be quad-packed in a vertical launch system for future ROCN surface combatants, but a less-risky alternative arrangement of above-deck, fixed oblique launchers is seen as more likely for upgrading these French-built frigates.

Construction and career 
Wu Chang was launched on 27 November 1995 at the DCNS in Lorient. Commissioned on 16 December 1997.

On 31 January 2018, the Ministry of National Defense of the Republic of China conducted the Chinese New Year Strengthened Combat Readiness Exercise at the Zuoying Naval Base, with Wu Chang as its flagship. The Captain Huang Shuqing of the Wuchang warship was the first female captain of a first-class combat ship of the Republic of China Navy.

Gallery

References 

1995 ships
Ships built in France
Kang Ding-class frigates